The Abidjan–Lagos Corridor, also known as the Abidjan–Lagos Megalopolis, is an emerging transnational megalopolis on the coast of southern West Africa. It stretches from Abidjan to Lagos, crossing five independent states (Côte d'Ivoire, Ghana, Togo, Benin, and Nigeria) from west to east, and includes two political capitals and many regional economic centers. The corridor has a length of approximately 965 kilometers (600 miles). Within the megalopolis, a significant portion of West Africa's economic output is generated, and cities within the corridor are among the most economically developed of their respective countries, for which agglomeration effects and access to the Atlantic Ocean are responsible. The population within the region is experiencing rapid growth, and nearly 50 million people are expected to live within the corridor by 2035. According to projections, by the end of the 21st century, the region could become the largest urban region with continuous settlement in the world, then with up to half a billion inhabitants.

After the decolonization of Africa, politically independent states emerged in West Africa and urban growth accelerated. Migrants moved from the interior to the more developed coastal areas, for example in Ghana to the region around Accra or in Nigeria to the metropolitan region of Lagos. Rapid urban growth led to the merging of previously independent settlements into large agglomerations with an economic division of labor. This occurred first domestically and later in transnational regions (e.g., between Lagos and neighboring Benin). However, urban growth was largely unplanned and led to severe urban sprawl, as little investment was made in the construction of multi-story housing. Future investment needs are therefore very high.

Due to the linguistic, cultural and political differences between the countries located in the corridor, the region's economic potential has not yet been fully exploited. There has been little alignment of standards and construction of common infrastructure, and even within the countries, transportation links are often unreliable.

Cities 

Listed from west to east.

Abidjan-Lagos Highway 

Construction of a highway route from Abidjan to Lagos (Abidjan-Lagos Highway) is scheduled to begin in 2025. The project is expected to cost $15 billion and increase regional economic integration. The African Development Bank is involved in the financing. So far, the Dakar-Lagos Highway forms the main transport axis in the region.

Airports 

 Cadjehoun Airport, Cotonou
 Félix-Houphouët-Boigny International Airport, Abidjan
 Kotoka International Airport, Accra
 Lomé–Tokoin International Airport, Lomé
 Murtala Muhammed International Airport, Lagos
 Takoradi Airport, Sekondi-Takoradi

Metro systems 

 Abidjan Metro
 Lagos Metro

Ports 

 Port of Abidjan
 Port of Cotonou
 Port of Lagos
 Port of Lomé
 Port of Tema
 Port of Takoradi

External links 

 The Lagos Abidjan Corridor doctoral thesis at ETH Zürich

References 

Abidjan
Lagos
Transborder agglomerations